Joachim Steetz (12 November 1804 –  24 March 1862) was a German botanist. His herbarium, comprising more than 5000 specimens from over 160 collectors and 30 countries was purchased in 1863 by Victorian Government Botanist Ferdinand von Mueller for the sum of 80 pounds. The collection is currently housed at the National Herbarium of Victoria. The herbarium was compiled by Steetz over more than thirty years and comprises 160 collectors from more than 30 countries, including type specimens from plant collectors of the time including:
Nils Johan Andersson (Galápagos Islands)
Nikolaus Binder
Christian Friedrich Ecklon (South Africa)
Joseph Dalton Hooker
Johann Wilhelm Karl Moritz
Wilhelm Peters
Ludwig Preiss (Western Australia)
Anton Rochel (The Banat)
Moritz Richard Schomburgk
Berthold Carl Seemann
Charles Wilkins Short (North America)
Franz Sieber
Theodor Siemssen
Andrew Sinclair
Thomas Thomson
Nikolai Turczaninow (Russia)
Jens Vahl (Arctic)
Karl Ludwig Philipp Zeyher (South Africa)

Standard author abbreviation

Selected publications
1847: “Revisio generis Comesperma Labill. et synopsis Lasiopetalearum et Biittneriearum in Nova Hollandia indigenarum.” (Hamburg). [Preprint of Lehmann op. cit. 2: 291–315, 316–317 (?- 367, including Fleischeria) (2–5 Aug. 1848) n.v., see Stafleu & Cowan 1985.]
1848: "Nekrolog. Entomol. Zeitung" 9(7): 194–198. – Obituary of Wilhelm von Winthem (1799–1847).
1853. “Die Familie der Tremandreen und ihre Verwandtschaft zu der Familie der Lasiopetaleen.” (Hamburg). [Sept.-Oct. 1853.] 
1854: "Tremandreae". In Lehmann, J.G.C. (ed.), “Plantae Preissianae” (Hamburg). 1: 211–223. [9–11 Feb. 1845.] 
1854: "Compositae". In Lehmann op. cit. 1: 417–490. [pp. 417–480, 14–16 Aug.; pp. 481–490, 3–5 Nov.]
1854: "Compositae". In Seemann, B. (ed.), “ The botany of the voyage of H.M.S. Herald” (Lovell Reeve: London), pp. 139–160. [Feb. 1854; part of the “ Flora of the Isthmus of Panama”.]
1854: "Ein deutsches Urtheil über eine englische Kritik". Bonplandia 2(14): 169–170. [15 July 1854.]
1854: "Trigonopterum" Steetz in Andersson, Kongl. Vetensk. Acad. Handl. 1853: 183 (1854). [c. 7 Sept. 1854.]
1854: "Dr Steetz fiber den Begriff von Species". Bonplandia 2(21): 244–246. [1 Nov. 1854.] 
1854: "Zuriickweisung, Dem Redacteur der ‘Bonplandia’". Bonplandia 2(21): 246–247. [1 Nov. 1854.]
1855: "Fried. E. L. von Fischer. Bonplandia: 3(2): 18–21. [1 Feb. 1855.] – Obituary of F.E.L. von Fischer (1782–1854). 
1855: "Gardeners’ Chronicle’s ‘Bad German habit’". Dem Redacteur der Bonplandia. Bonplandia 3(11): 147–155. [15 June 1855.] 
1855: "Replik. Dem Redacteur der Bonplandia". Bonplandia 3(13&14): 203–205. [15 July 1855.] 
1856: "Klotzsch’s Angreifer. Dem Redacteur der Bonplandia". Bonplandia 4(17): 280–281. [1 Sept. 1856.] 
1857: "Klotzsch’s Begoniaceen. Dem Redacteur der Bonplandia". Bonplandia 5(4): 60–65. [1 March 1857.] 
1857: "Compositae". In Seemann, B. op. cit. pp. 384–395. [Jan.-Jun. 1857; part of the “ Flora of the Island of Hongkong”.]
1857: "Duhaldea Chinensis, De Cand. Ein Beitrag zur Systematik der Compositae". Bonplandia 5(19): 305–310. [1 Nov. 1857.] 
1858: "Elvira biflora, DC. und Unxia digyna, Steetz. Dem Redacteur der Bonplandia". Bonplandia 6: 128- 131. [15 April 1858.] 
1863: "Streptoglossa Steetz in F. Muell", Trans. Bot. Soc. Edinburgh 7: 492–495.
1864: "Compositae". In Peters, W. C. H. (ed.), “Naturwissenschaftliche Reise nach Mossambique” (Berlin). 6: 305–500.

Named by Steetz

Genera
Adelostigma Steetz
Ambassa Steetz
Anisolepis Steetz
Chrysodiscus Steetz
Chthonocephalus Steetz
Crystallopollen Steetz
Gongrothamnus Steetz
Gymnogyne Steetz
Gynaphanes Steetz
Hyalosperma Steetz
Hypericophyllum Steetz
Lysistemma Steetz
Menotriche Steetz
Pachysurus Steetz
Pachythelia Steetz
Platytheca Steetz
Pleiotaxis Steetz
Pogonolepis Steetz
Pterochaeta Steetz
Punduana Steetz
Rhynchostemon Steetz
Schoenia Steetz
Siemssenia Steetz
Silphiosperma Steetz
Streptoglossa Steetz ex F.Muell.
Trigonopterum Steetz
Tuberostylis Steetz
Xipholepis Steetz

Named in honor of Steetz

Genera
Steetzia Lehm.
Steetzia Sonder

Species
Achyrocline steetzii Vatke
Aster steetzii F. Muell.
Baccharis steetzi Andersson
Bothriocline steetziana Wild & Pope
Eupatorium steetzii Robinson
Helichrysum steetzii Tovey & Morris
Nidorella steetzii J.A. Schmidt
Senecio steetzii Bolle
Sphaeranthus steetzii Oliver & Hiern
Streptoglossa steetzii F. Muell.
Vernonia steetziana Oliver & Hiern
Waitzia steetziana Lehm.

References

1804 births
1864 deaths
19th-century German botanists
German taxonomists